is a 2013 Japanese spy thriller film directed by Takashi Miike. It was nominated for the Palme d'Or at the 2013 Cannes Film Festival and it was released on 26 April 2013.

Plot

Ninagawa was a powerful man in Japanese politics and with top economic connections. His granddaughter is then murdered. The suspect is Kunihide Kiyomaru. Three months after the murder of his granddaughter, Ninagawa places a whole page ad in the three major Japanese newspapers. The ad states that if Kiyomaru is killed, Ninagawa will offer ¥1,000,000,000 as a reward. Kunihide Kiyomaru turns himself in at the Fukuoka Prefectural Police station. Five detectives from the Security Police (SP) of the Tokyo Metropolitan Police Department travel to Fukuoka to escort Kunihide Kiyomaru back to the Tokyo Metropolitan Police Department. The distance between Fukuoka and Tokyo is apprixmately 1,200 km.

Cast
Takao Osawa as Kazuki Mekari
Nanako Matsushima as Atsuko Shiraiwa
Tatsuya Fujiwara as Kunihide Kiyomaru
Masatō Ibu as Kenji Sekiya
Kento Nagayama as Masaki Kamihashi
Hirotarō Honda as Oki
Kimiko Yo as Chikako Yuri
Tsutomu Yamazaki as Ninagawa

Production
The filming began on 19 August 2012, and took place in Japan, primarily in Aichi and Mie Prefectures, and Taiwan. After the Shinkansen denied filming onboard its rolling stock, the train scenes were shot at the Taiwan High Speed Rail in September that year, with the support of the Taipei Film Commission.

Remake
On 24 October 2016, it was announced that EuropaCorp is planning an English-language remake to be penned by Creighton Rothenberger and Katrin Benedikt and produced by Depth of Field's Chris Weitz, Andrew Miano and Dan Balgoyen and All Nippon Entertainment Works's Sandy Climan and Annmarie Bailey, and Nippon Television's Naoaki Kitajima.

References

External links

  
 

2013 films
2013 action thriller films
2010s police films
2010s spy thriller films
Films about bodyguards
Films about contract killing
Films about corruption
Films about murderers
Films about police misconduct
Films about terrorism in Asia
Films based on Japanese novels
Films directed by Takashi Miike
Nippon TV films
Films set in Fukuoka Prefecture
Films set in Tokyo
Films shot in Japan
Films shot in Taiwan
Japanese action thriller films
Japanese films about revenge
OLM, Inc.
Warner Bros. films
2010s Japanese films
2010s Japanese-language films